Lasionycta mutilata is a moth of the family Noctuidae. It is found from Oregon and Yellowstone National Park, Montana and Wyoming, northward to the Alaskan Panhandle and the Rocky Mountains of Alberta. It is absent from the Queen Charlotte Islands.

It is found in the high transition zone and subalpine conifer forests and is nocturnal.

Adults are on wing from late June through August.

External links
A Revision of Lasionycta Aurivillius (Lepidoptera, Noctuidae) for North America and notes on Eurasian species, with descriptions of 17 new species, 6 new subspecies, a new genus, and two new species of Tricholita Grote
Images
Bug Guide

Lasionycta
Moths of North America
Moths described in 1898